Suge Facula is a bright region on the surface of Mercury, located at 26.1 N,	300.4 W.  It was named by the IAU in 2018.  Suge is the Basque word for snake.

Suge Facula lies between the inner peak ring and rim in the southeast portion of Rachmaninoff crater, in the Hokusai quadrangle of Mercury.

References

Surface features of Mercury